Scuola di ladri is a 1986 Italian comedy film directed by Neri Parenti starring Enrico Maria Salerno.

Plot summary 
Rome, Italy mid-1980s. Three cousins, who do not know each other and who live poor, are gathered from paralytic uncle Aliprando who leads them to a "big job". After they have completed the mission, he robs them.

Cast 
 Enrico Maria Salerno as Aliprando Siraghi
 Paolo Villaggio as Dalmazio Siraghi
 Lino Banfi as Amalio Siraghi
 Massimo Boldi as Egisto Siraghi
 Barbara Scoppa as Marisa Padovan
 Ennio Antonelli as Fake priest
 Antonio Barrios as Franco Nero
 Claudio Boldi as The guard 
 Corrado Monteforte as Minotti
 Antonio Allocca as Wealthy farmer of Caserta
 Willy Moser as Embassy Luxembourg usher

Release
The film was released in Italy on September 26, 1986 It was one of the most popular Italian films of the year with over 2 million admissions.

Sequel  
Scuola di ladri - Parte seconda (1987)

References

External links

1986 films
1986 comedy films
1980s Italian-language films
Italian comedy films
Films directed by Neri Parenti
Films scored by Bruno Zambrini
1980s Italian films